is a Goemon game released for the PlayStation on December 23, 1998. It was released alongside Goemon's Great Adventure for the Nintendo 64. It was the second game in the series released for the PlayStation and also the second game in 3D, following Mystical Ninja Starring Goemon.

The game plays from a top-down view, and introduces a kick move to each character's repertoire of techniques.

References

1998 video games
Ganbare Goemon games
Japan-exclusive video games
PlayStation (console) games
PlayStation (console)-only games
Video games developed in Japan
Single-player video games